Pam Shriver was the defending champion but did not compete that year.

First-seeded Martina Navratilova won in the final 6–7, 6–3, 7–6 against Lori McNeil.

Seeds
A champion seed is indicated in bold text while text in italics indicates the round in which that seed was eliminated. The top four seeds received a bye to the second round.

  Martina Navratilova (champion)
  Chris Evert (quarterfinals)
  Gabriela Sabatini (quarterfinals)
  Natasha Zvereva (second round)
  Zina Garrison (semifinals)
  Claudia Kohde-Kilsch (quarterfinals)
  Lori McNeil (final)
  Mary Joe Fernández (semifinals)

Draw

Final

Section 1

Section 2

References
 1989 Toray Pan Pacific Open Draw

Singles